Quietly There is an album by jazz trumpeter Chet Baker and the Carmel Strings recorded in 1966 and released on the World Pacific label.

Reception

Allmusic rated the album with 3 stars.

Track listing
 "Early Autumn" (Ralph Burns, Woody Herman, Johnny Mercer) - 2:43
 "I Left My Heart in San Francisco" (George Cory, Douglass Cross) - 2:29
 "Forget Him" (Tony Hatch) - 2:41
 "The Christmas Song" (Mel Tormé, Bob Wells) - 3:05
 "Quietly There" (Johnny Mandel, Morgan Ames) - 2:38
 "Spring Can Really Hang You Up the Most" (Fran Landesman, Tommy Wolf) - 2:52
 "Stranger on the Shore" (Acker Bilk) - 2:39
 "You Don't Have to Say You Love Me" (Pino Donaggio, Vito Pallavicini, Vicki Wickham, Simon Napier-Bell) - 2:35
 "The More I See You" (Harry Warren, Mack Gordon) - 2:48
 "No More Blues (Chega de Saudade)" (Antônio Carlos Jobim, Vinícius de Moraes) - 2:24
 "Message to Michael" (Burt Bacharach, Hal David) - 2:42
 "(You're My) Soul and Inspiration" (Barry Mann, Cynthia Weil) - 2:38

Personnel
Chet Baker - flugelhorn
The Carmel Strings
Harry Betts, Julian Lee - arranger, conductor

References 

1966 albums
Chet Baker albums
Pacific Jazz Records albums